Mercer County is a county in Illinois. According to the 2010 census, it had a population of 16,434. Its county seat is Aledo.

Mercer County is included in the Davenport-Moline-Rock Island, IA-IL Metropolitan Statistical Area.

History
Mercer County is named for Hugh Mercer (1726–1777), a physician and general during the American Revolution who died from wounds suffered at the Battle of Princeton.

In May 1812, Congress passed an act which set aside lands in Arkansas, Michigan, and Illinois as payment to volunteer soldiers in the War of 1812. Mercer County was part of this "Military Tract."

Seven years after Illinois became a state, Mercer County was founded. It was formed from unorganized territory near Pike County on January 13, 1825.  Although the county had been created, its government was not organized for several years; for administration purposes it was attached first to Schuyler County (until 1826), then to Peoria (until 1831), and finally to Warren County.  The organization of the county government was finally completed in 1835, after a large influx of settlers following the Black Hawk War.

Geography

Climate and weather

Major highways
  U.S. Highway 67
  Illinois Route 17
  Illinois Route 94
  Illinois Route 135

Adjacent counties
 Rock Island County - north
 Henry County - east
 Knox County - southeast
 Henderson County - south
 Warren County - south
 Des Moines County, Iowa - southwest
 Louisa County, Iowa - west

Demographics

As of the 2010 United States Census, there were 16,434 people, 6,734 households, and 4,724 families residing in the county. The racial makeup of the county was 98.3% white, 0.3% black or African American, 0.3% Asian, 0.1% American Indian, 0.3% from other races, and 0.7% from two or more races. Those of Hispanic or Latino origin made up 1.9% of the population. In terms of ancestry, 25.9% were German, 18.2% were Irish, 11.3% were English, 9.4% were Swedish, and 7.4% were American.

Of the 6,734 households, 30.1% had children under the age of 18 living with them, 58.3% were married couples living together, 7.9% had a female householder with no husband present, 29.8% were non-families, and 25.8% of all households were made up of individuals. The average household size was 2.41 and the average family size was 2.88. The median age was 43.7 years.

The median income for a household in the county was $50,909 and the median income for a family was $62,025. Males had a median income of $46,136 versus $30,392 for females. The per capita income for the county was $25,332. About 8.2% of families and 9.3% of the population were below the poverty line, including 14.9% of those under age 18 and 7.2% of those age 65 or over.

Communities

Cities
 Aledo
 Keithsburg
 New Boston

Villages

 Alexis
 Joy
 Matherville
 North Henderson
 Reynolds   (Part in Rock Island County)
 Seaton
 Sherrard
 Viola
 Windsor

Unincorporated communities

 Boden
 Burgess
 Cable
 Eliza
 Gilchrist
 Hamlet
 Mannon
 Marston
 Millersburg
 Petersville
 Preemption
 Shale City
 Sunbeam
 Swedona
 Wanlock

Townships
Mercer County is divided into fifteen townships:

 Abington
 Duncan
 Eliza
 Greene
 Keithsburg
 Mercer
 Millersburg
 New Boston
 North Henderson
 Ohio Grove
 Perryton
 Preemption
 Richland Grove
 Rivoli
 Suez

Politics

Historically, Mercer County was a solidly Republican Yankee-influenced county, and before the Republican Party existed a stronghold of the Whig Party. The county never voted for a Democratic presidential candidate until Lyndon Johnson’s 1964 landslide over Barry Goldwater – the solitary break in Whig and Republican dominance occurring in 1912 when the GOP was mortally split and Progressive Theodore Roosevelt carried the county over conservative incumbent President William Howard Taft. After Johnson’s victory in the county, Mercer voted to being Republican between 1968 and 1984, but Reagan’s landslide in that election saw a swing to the Democrats that was capitalized upon by Michael Dukakis to carry the county in 1988. Between then and 2012, Mercer was solidly Democratic, but concern over declining economic opportunities in the “Rust Belt” caused a dramatic swing to populist Republican Donald Trump in 2016. Trump’s performance was the best by a Republican since Richard Nixon's 3,000-plus-county landslide in 1972.

Mercer County is located in Illinois's 17th Congressional District and is currently represented by Democrat Cheri Bustos. Within the Illinois House of Representatives, the county is located in the 74th district and is currently represented by Republican Daniel Swanson. The county is located in the 37th district of the Illinois Senate, and is currently represented by Republican Chuck Weaver.

See also
 National Register of Historic Places listings in Mercer County, Illinois

Footnotes

Further reading
 William C. Ives, "Abraham Lincoln in Mercer County, Illinois, 1832, 1834, 1858," Journal of the Illinois State Historical Society, vol. 101 (Fall–Winter 2008), pp. 329–347.
 History of Mercer and Henderson Counties, Together with Biographical Matter, Statistics, Etc. Chicago: H.H. Hill and Company, 1882.

External links
 
 Illinois Ancestors Mercer County

 
Illinois counties
1825 establishments in Illinois
Illinois counties on the Mississippi River
Populated places established in 1825
Quad Cities